is a Japanese motorcycle racer. In 2016, she became the first Japanese female rider to compete in a Grand Prix in 21 years. She currently competes aboard a TSR3 Honda in the MFJ All-Japan Road Race J-GP3 Championship.

Career statistics

Grand Prix motorcycle racing

By season

Races by year

References

External links

1992 births
Living people
Japanese motorcycle racers
Moto3 World Championship riders
Female motorcycle racers